Malo Brisout de Barneville (born August 3, 1993), better known by his stage name Tez Cadey, is a French American DJ, record producer and songwriter. He is most known for his single "Seve" released in 2015.

Career
Born in Morristown, New Jersey to a French father and a Cambodian mother, Brisout began playing music early in his youth, first on the piano, then the guitar. He grew up to the music his parents listened to, including bands like New Order or Inner City. When he was sixteen he began composing and posting online his remixes and productions.

In 2014, he released his EP "Seve" independently. It received such popular attention the EP was taken down and the song re-released with Ultra Music in 2015. "Seve" has since then reached more than 300 million streams worldwide.

Discography

Albums 
 2015 : Walls EP

 2018 : Lizard Days

 2021 : No Place I Call Home

Singles

References

External links
 
 

1993 births
French electronic musicians
French DJs
Remixers
Living people
Tropical house musicians
Electronic dance music DJs
People from Morristown, New Jersey
Musicians from New Jersey